The 2016 G20 Hangzhou summit was the eleventh meeting of the Group of Twenty (G20). It was held on 4–5 September 2016 in the city of Hangzhou, Zhejiang. It was the first ever G20 summit to be hosted in China and the second in an Asian country after 2010 G20 Seoul summit was hosted in South Korea.

Context

Pollution in China 

In the days before the G20 Hangzhou summit, only some vehicles were allowed through the city, construction sites were stopped, inhabitants received a week-long holidays (and were encouraged to leave the city) and factories in the region (including more than two hundred steel mills) were asked to stop their production (in order to temporarily reduce air pollution).

Climate change 

On 3 September 2016, Barack Obama and Xi Jinping announced the ratification of the Paris Agreement (of the 2015 United Nations Climate Change Conference) by their countries. After they did it, it is 26 countries which have ratified the agreement so far; the United States and China represent respectively 18 percent and 20 percent of global carbon dioxide emissions (the driving force behind global warming).

Economic statements 

The main themes of final communiqué of the summit are:
 Fight against tax evasion (asking the OECD for a black list of tax havens).
 Favour international trade and investments and opposition to protectionism.
 Fiscal stimulus and innovation to boost economic growth.
 Combating "populist attacks" against globalization.
 Strengthen support for refugees.

Summit documents 

The heads of state and government of G20 issued a joint statement with a summary of the main results of the meeting. The statement is divided in the following documents:
 Communiqué 2016
 Annex to the Leaders' Declaration 
 Hangzhou Action Plan 
 Blueprint on Innovative Growth 
 G20 Action Plan on the 2030 Agenda for Sustainable Development

Participating leaders 

List of leaders who took part in the 2016 G20 Hangzhou summit:

Invited guests

International organizations

Controversy

Internet censorship 
Xi Jinping in the speech quoted "Guoyu", Traditional Chinese history books, in Chapter 9 of the "" (meaning reducing taxes and make road easy to walk, promote commercialization, and relax agriculture), but he mistakenly pronounced it as "" (""  means Undress), the Central Propaganda Department ordered media and social platforms to prohibit this discussion.

References

External links 

 Official website

G20 summits
G20 Hangzhou summit
Diplomatic conferences in China
21st-century diplomatic conferences (Global)
G20 Hangzhou summit
G20 Hangzhou summit
History of Hangzhou
G20 Hangzhou summit